There's a Little Bit of Hank in Me is the twenty-seventh studio album by American country music artist Charley Pride. It was released in 1980 via RCA Nashville. The album peaked at number 1 on the Billboard Top Country Albums chart and features Pride performing songs previously written and recorded by Hank Williams Sr.

Track listing

Chart performance

References

1980 albums
Charley Pride albums
albums produced by Jerry Bradley (music executive)
RCA Records albums
Hank Williams tribute albums